In mathematics, the Serre spectral sequence (sometimes Leray–Serre spectral sequence to acknowledge earlier work of Jean Leray in the Leray spectral sequence) is an important tool in algebraic topology. It expresses, in the language of homological algebra, the singular (co)homology of the total space X of a (Serre) fibration in terms of the (co)homology of the base space B and the fiber F. The result is due to Jean-Pierre Serre in his doctoral dissertation.

Cohomology spectral sequence
Let  be a Serre fibration of topological spaces, and let F be the (path-connected) fiber. The Serre cohomology spectral sequence is the following:

Here, at least under standard simplifying conditions, the coefficient group in the -term is the q-th integral cohomology group of F, and the outer group is the singular cohomology of B with coefficients in that group. 

Strictly speaking, what is meant is cohomology with respect to the local coefficient system on B given by the cohomology of the various fibers. Assuming for example, that B is simply connected, this collapses to the usual cohomology. For a path connected base, all the different fibers are homotopy equivalent. In particular, their cohomology is isomorphic, so the choice of "the" fiber does not give any ambiguity.

The abutment means integral cohomology of the total space X.

This spectral sequence can be derived from an exact couple built out of the long exact sequences of the cohomology of the pair , where  is the restriction of the fibration over the p-skeleton of B.  More precisely, using this notation,

   

There is a multiplicative structure

coinciding on the E2-term with (−1)qs times the cup product, and with respect to which the differentials  are (graded) derivations inducing the product on the -page from the one on the -page.

Homology spectral sequence 
Similarly to the cohomology spectral sequence, there is one for homology:

where the notations are dual to the ones above.

Example computations

Hopf fibration 
The -page of the Leray–Serre Spectral sequence reads

The differential  goes  down and  right. In particular, this sequence degenerates at E2 = E∞. The E3-page reads

The spectral sequence abuts to  i.e.  Evaluating at the interesting parts, we have  and  Knowing the cohomology of  both are zero, so the differential  is an isomorphism.

Sphere bundle on a complex projective variety 
Given a complex n-dimensional projective variety  there is a canonical family of line bundles  for  coming from the embedding . This is given by the global sections  which send

If we construct a rank  vector bundle  which is a finite whitney sum of vector bundles we can construct a sphere bundle  whose fibers are the spheres . We see that the only non-trivial differentials are given on the -page and are defined by cupping with the Euler class . For example, consider the vector bundle  for  a K3 surface. Then, the spectral sequence reads as

In this case, the only non-trivial differential is then

We can finish this computation by noting the only nontrivial cohomology groups are

Basic pathspace fibration 
We begin first with a basic example; consider the path space fibration 

We know the homology of the base and total space, so our intuition tells us that the Serre spectral sequence should be able to tell us the homology of the loop space. This is an example of a case where we can study the homology of a fibration by using the E∞ page (the homology of the total space) to control what can happen on the E2 page. So recall that 

Thus we know when q = 0, we are just looking at the regular integer valued homology groups Hp(Sn+1) which has value  in degrees 0 and n+1 and value 0 everywhere else. However, since the path space is contractible, we know that by the time the sequence gets to E∞, everything becomes 0 except for the group at p = q = 0. Inductively repeating this process shows that Hi(ΩSn+1) has value  at integer multiples of n and 0 everywhere else.

Cohomology ring of complex projective space 
We compute the cohomology of  using the fibration:

Now, on the E2 page, in the 0,0 coordinate we have the identity of the ring. In the 0,1 coordinate, we have an element i that generates  However, we know that by the limit page, there can only be nontrivial generators in degree 2n+1 telling us that the generator i must transgress to some element x in the 2,0 coordinate. Now, this tells us that there must be an element ix in the 2,1 coordinate. We then see that d(ix) = x2 by the Leibniz rule telling us that the 4,0 coordinate must be x2 since there can be no nontrivial homology until degree 2n+1.

In the case of infinite complex projective space, taking limits gives the answer

Fourth homotopy group of the three-sphere 
A more sophisticated application of the Serre spectral sequence is the computation  This particular example illustrates a systematic technique which one can use in order to deduce information about the higher homotopy groups of spheres. Consider the following fibration which is an isomorphism on 

 

where  is an Eilenberg–MacLane space. Since there is nothing in degree 3 in the total cohomology, we know this must be killed by an isomorphism. In particular we find that  But now since we killed off the lower homotopy groups of X (i.e., the groups in degrees less than 4) by using the iterated fibration, we know that  by the Hurewicz theorem, telling us that 

Corollary: 

Proof: Take the long exact sequence of homotopy groups for the Hopf fibration .

See also 
 Gysin sequence

References 
The Serre spectral sequence is covered in most textbooks on algebraic topology, e.g.

 Allen Hatcher, Spectral Sequences 
 Edwin Spanier, Algebraic topology, Springer

Also

 James Davis, Paul Kirk,  Lecture notes in algebraic topology gives many nice applications of the Serre spectral sequence.

An elegant construction is due to
 Andreas Dress, Zur Spektralsequenz einer Faserung, Inventiones Mathematicae 3 (1967), 172–178, EuDML.

The case of simplicial sets is treated in 
 Paul Goerss, Rick Jardine, Simplicial homotopy theory, Birkhäuser

Algebraic topology
Spectral sequences